El Real de Santa María Airport  is an airstrip serving the small town of El Real de Santa María, in the Darién Province of Panama. There are no paved roads between the two towns.

Airlines and destinations

See also

Transport in Panama
List of airports in Panama

References

External links
OpenStreetMap - El Real
OurAirports - El Real Airport
FallingRain - El Real

Airports in Panama
Buildings and structures in Darién Province